Vurğun (also, Grünfeld, Kalininkänd, and Kalininkend) is a village and municipality in the Agstafa Rayon of Azerbaijan.  It has a population of 2,710.  Founded as the German colony of Grünfeld, the town was renamed during the Soviet period for Mikhail Kalinin, and afterward in 1991, in honor of the writer Samad Vurgun.

References 

Populated places in Aghstafa District